John Palin (born 16 July 1934) is a British former sports shooter. He competed at the 1968 Summer Olympics and the 1972 Summer Olympics.<ref name="SportsRef"></ref

References

External links
 

1934 births
Living people
British male sport shooters
Olympic shooters of Great Britain
Shooters at the 1968 Summer Olympics
Shooters at the 1972 Summer Olympics
Place of birth missing (living people)
20th-century British people